The Boy Cried Murder is a 1966 British thriller film directed by George P. Breakston and starring Fraser MacIntosh, Veronica Hurst, and Phil Brown. The film is based on the novelette of the same name by Cornell Woolrich. The movie is a remake of the 1949 film The Window.

Plot
A twelve-year-old boy is disappointed by the fact that his mother brought a stepfather to their house. He constantly tries to distance himself from the man, inventing various stories, and is punished for doing so. While on vacation in Yugoslavia, his parents leave on a boat trip without him, and the boy accidentally witnesses a real murder. Later on, he tells this to his parents, but because of his previous behaviour, they do not believe him. However, this is not the whole trouble. The murderer has seen an unexpected witness of his crime, and now he wants to get rid of the boy.

Cast

Tim Barrett as Mike
Phil Brown as Tom Durrant
Veronica Hurst as Clare Durrant
Beba Loncar as Susie
Frazer MacIntosh as Jonathan Durrant
Alex MacIntosh as Sergeant
Edward Steel as Col. Wetherall
Anita Sharp-Bolster as Mrs. Wetherall
Sonja Hlebs as Marianne
Vuka Dundjerovic as Mrs. Bosnic

See also
The story has been adapted three more times:
 The Window (1949)
 Eyewitness (1970)
 Cloak & Dagger (1984)

References

External links
 
 
 

British thriller films
Films directed by George Breakston
1966 thriller films
1966 films
1960s English-language films
1960s British films